Benard Kiplangat Keter  (born May 25, 1992) is an American athlete who competes primarily in the 3000 metres steeplechase.

Personal life
Born in Molo, Kenya, Keter attended Tengecha Boys High School in Kapkatet, Kenya. His brother is Tareq Mubarak Taher who, running for Bahrain, finished 11th in the steeplechase at the 2008 Olympics in Beijing.

Career
Keter came to America on a scholarship and won numerous honors during his college days as a distance runner for Cloud County Community College, Wayland Baptist University and Texas Tech University. Keter was NJCAA 3000m steeplechase, an NAIA national champion in cross country, the 5,000m indoors and the steeplechase outdoors, and was a four-time Big 12 champion and a first-team all-American.

In August 2019 he finished 4th in the 2019 Pan American Games – Men's 3000 metres steeplechase, held in Lima in a time of 8:32.76. He competed in The Match Europe v USA at the Dinamo National Olympic Stadium, Minsk and finished 5th in 8:44.63. Keter is the United States Army Reserve, where he is in unit supply holding the rank of specialist.

He ran an 8:21.81 at the American Olympic trials at Hayward Field, Eugene, Oregon on June 25, 2021, coming in second to Hillary Bor and ahead of Mason Ferlic. The result ensured Keter a place in the U.S. contingent for the delayed 2020 Summer Games in Tokyo. He ran a personal best time of 8:17.31 in finishing sixth in his Olympic heat.

References

External links 
 
 

1992 births
Living people
American male steeplechase runners
American military Olympians
Athletes (track and field) at the 2019 Pan American Games
Pan American Games competitors for the United States
Athletes (track and field) at the 2020 Summer Olympics
Olympic track and field athletes of the United States
United States Army reservists
United States Army soldiers
U.S. Army World Class Athlete Program